Streptomyces mangrovi is a bacterium species from the genus of Streptomyces which has been isolated from mangrove soil from the Dongzhaigang National Nature Reserve from the Haikou City, in China.

See also 
 List of Streptomyces species

References

Further reading

External links
Type strain of Streptomyces mangrovi at BacDive -  the Bacterial Diversity Metadatabase	

mangrovi
Bacteria described in 2015